John Pope is a male former rower who competed for England.

Rowing career
He represented England and won a silver medal in the eights at the 1954 British Empire and Commonwealth Games in Vancouver, Canada. He was a member of the Thames Rowing Club.

References

English male rowers
Commonwealth Games medallists in rowing
Commonwealth Games silver medallists for England
Rowers at the 1954 British Empire and Commonwealth Games
Medallists at the 1954 British Empire and Commonwealth Games